Agostino Cossia (21 December 1930 – 14 September 2016) was an Italian boxer. He competed in the men's featherweight event at the 1956 Summer Olympics. At the 1956 Summer Olympics, he lost to Vladimir Safronov of the Soviet Union.

References

External links
 

1930 births
2016 deaths
Italian male boxers
Olympic boxers of Italy
Boxers at the 1956 Summer Olympics
Boxers from Naples
Featherweight boxers
20th-century Italian people